Seven Myths About Education is a book about education by Daisy Christodoulou.  It suggests that declarative knowledge such as facts is being neglected in modern education because of the priority given to procedural knowledge such as skills.  It was first published as an e-book by The Curriculum Centre in 2013 and then in hardback and paperback  by Routledge in 2014.

The seven myths are:

 Facts prevent understanding
 Teacher-led instruction is passive   
 The 21st century fundamentally changes everything   
 You can always just look it up   
 We should teach transferable skills   
 Projects and activities are the best way to learn   
 Teaching knowledge is indoctrination

References

Books about education

·